Francisco Andrés Silva Gajardo (born 11 February 1986), known as Francisco Silva, is a Chilean former professional footballer who played as a defensive midfielder. He is considered one of the greatest Chilean defensive midfielders of all time. His winning penalty in Copa America Centenario gave Chile their second consecutive Copa America title.

Club career
Born in Quillota, Silva joined Universidad Católica's youth setup in 2000, aged 14. In 2005, he made his senior debuts, while on loan at lowly Deportes Ovalle, and appeared twice for the first-team in the following year. In 2007, he joined Osorno, also on loan, where he was ever-present in the promotion campaign.

After his return, Silva established himself as a regular for the UC, and scored his first goal on 7 November 2009, in a 4–1 home routing over Universidad Concepción.

Lecce
In the 2010 summer Silva was linked to Lecce, but due to reductions in the non-EU registration quota (two for one during the summer) the deal collapsed, as the club already signed Rubén Olivera.

CA Osasuna
On 22 January 2013 Silva was loaned to La Liga strugglers CA Osasuna until June. He made his debut abroad on 2 February, coming on as a second-half substitute in a 1–0 home win over Celta de Vigo. On 8 March Silva netted his first goal for Osasuna, but in a 1–2 loss at Real Betis; on 4 June the Navarrese side exercised the buyout clause, paying €1.2 million for his services. He featured regularly for the club during the 2013–14 campaign, which ended in relegation.

Club Brugge
On 29 August 2014 Silva was loaned to Club Brugge KV, in a season-long deal with a buyout clause. On 13 July of the following year he was transferred to Chiapas.

Career statistics

International career
Silva made his main squad debut on 22 January 2011, starting in a 1–1 draw against United States at Home Depot Center.

Silva was not initially named in Chile's 2015 Copa America squad but was added to the team due to an injury to Edson Puch.

Silva scored the winning goal in the 4-2 penalty shoot-out win against Argentina in the Copa América Centenario Final on 26 June 2016.

Honours

Club
Osorno
Primera B de Chile: 2007

Universidad Católica
Primera División de Chile (3): 2010, 2019, 2020
Copa Chile: 2011
Supercopa de Chile (1): 2020

Club Brugge
 Belgian Cup: 2014–15

Independiente
 Suruga Bank Championship: 2018

International
Chile
Copa América (2): 2015, 2016
FIFA Confederations Cup: Runner-up 2017

Notes

References

External links

 
 
 
 

1986 births
Living people
Footballers from Santiago
Chilean footballers
Chile international footballers
Association football midfielders
Chilean Primera División players
Club Deportivo Universidad Católica footballers
Primera B de Chile players
Deportes Ovalle footballers 
Provincial Osorno footballers
La Liga players
CA Osasuna players
Belgian Pro League players
Club Brugge KV players
Liga MX players
Chiapas F.C. footballers
Cruz Azul footballers
Argentine Primera División players
Club Atlético Independiente footballers
2011 Copa América players
2014 FIFA World Cup players
2015 Copa América players
Copa América Centenario players
2017 FIFA Confederations Cup players
Copa América-winning players
Chilean expatriate footballers
Chilean expatriate sportspeople in Spain
Chilean expatriate sportspeople in Belgium
Chilean expatriate sportspeople in Mexico
Chilean expatriate sportspeople in Argentina
Expatriate footballers in Spain
Expatriate footballers in Belgium
Expatriate footballers in Mexico
Expatriate footballers in Argentina